Beirut Naval Base is the first naval base and the headquarters of the Lebanese Navy, established in 1950. The base comprises a part of Port of Beirut, and was affected by the massive ammonium nitrate explosion on 4 August 2020.

References

Ports and harbors of Lebanon
Lebanese Navy bases
Ports and harbours of the Arab League